Typhoon Nakri, known in the Philippines as Typhoon Quiel, was an strong typhoon which made landfall in Vietnam causing 24 deaths and 13 missing and causing up to $49.4 million in damages, which were all in Vietnam.

Meteorological history
 

On November 5, a depression off the coast of the Philippines evolved into Tropical depression Quiel. Quiel intensified to become the twenty-fourth tropical storm of the season and was named Nakri by JMA. original forecasts showed it hitting Vietnam as a minor tropical storm, or a depression. however, on November 7, unexpected strengthening occurred, and the storm intensified into a typhoon. On November 9, Nakri began to weaken as it dropped beneath typhoon intensity because of the strong wind shear.

Impact

Southern Vietnam

Typhoon Nakri made landfall on Southern Vietnam on Monday it weaken rapidly while making landfall. Despite the fact it brought heavy rainfall on Southern Vietnam winds totaled up to 115-145 km/h (70-90 mph).

Philippines

When Typhoon Nakri transitioned into a tropical storm it brought tropical downpours to the Northwestern Philippines. In Luzon, the mixed effects of Nakri and a cold front produced sizeable heavy rain. The resulting floods and landslides killed 24 people and left 13 others missing. Cagayan Province alone suffered ₱1.8 billion (US$49.4 million) in damage.

References

External links 

 General Information of Typhoon Nakri (1924) from Digital Typhoon
 JMA Best Track Data of Typhoon Nakri (1924) (in Japanese)
 JMA Best Track (Graphics) of Typhoon Nakri (1924)

N
2019 natural disasters
November 2019 events in Asia
Typhoons in Vietnam
2019 Pacific typhoon season
November 2019 events in Vietnam